Myer Creek may refer to one of these streams:

 Myer Creek (Coyote Wash), in Imperial County, California
 Myer Creek (Mill Creek), in Washington County, Kansas
 Myer Creek (Green River, Ohio River), in McLean County, Kentucky
 Myer Creek (Bear Creek tributary), in Jackson County, Oregon, a tributary of the Rogue River
 Myer Creek (Curry County, Oregon), on the coast of Curry County, Oregon 
 Myer Creek (Corrotoman River), in Lancaster County, Virginia
 Myer Creek (Twisp River), in Okanogan County, Washington